Ukhwejo (Benkonjo) is one of  the few Bantu languages spoken in the Central African Republic.

References

Bantu languages
Makaa-Njem languages